Fair Warning is a 1931 American pre-Code Western film directed by Alfred L. Werker and starring George O'Brien, Louise Huntington and Mitchell Harris. It is a remake of the 1920 silent film The Untamed. The 1937 film Fair Warning is not a remake of this one. The film's premise came from a novel by Max Brand, which initially was published in serial form in The All-Story from December 7, 1918, through January 11, 1919.

Synopsis
When Whistlin' Dan Barry is warned to leave a town, he refuses to do so. As a result, he defeats Jim Silent (the town's villain) and gets romantic with Kate Cumberland.

Cast
 George O'Brien as Whistlin' Dan Barry  
 Louise Huntington as Kate Cumberland  
 Mitchell Harris as Jim Silent  
 George Brent as Les Haines  
 Nat Pendleton as Purvis  
 John Sheehan as Kelduff  
 Willard Robertson as Tex Calder  
 Ernie Adams as Jordan 
 Erwin Connelly as Morgan  
 Alphonse Ethier as Mr. Cumberland

Reception
A review in Harrison's Reports called Fair Warning "an excellent outdoor picture" that had O'Brien in a fearless role, helping him to win "the spectator's good will, which follows him throughout the story."

References

Bibliography
 Aubrey Solomon. The Fox Film Corporation, 1915-1935: A History and Filmography. McFarland, 2011.

External links
 
 

1931 films
1931 Western (genre) films
American Western (genre) films
Films directed by Alfred L. Werker
Fox Film films
Remakes of American films
Sound film remakes of silent films
American black-and-white films
1930s English-language films
1930s American films